Bùi Thị Nhạn (裴氏雁, ? – 10 July 1802) was a general and then an Empress of Tây Sơn dynasty.

Born in Tuy Viễn District (mordern Tây Sơn District), Bình Định Province. She was a daughter of Bùi Đức Lương, and also a sister of Bùi Đắc Tuyên. She is said to have learned martial arts as a child, later, she became a famous female general of Tây Sơn dynasty. She and Bùi Thị Xuân, Trần Thị Lan, Huỳnh Thị Cúc, Nguyễn Thị Dung, were known as Five Phoenix women generals of Tay Son dynasty ( 西山五鳳雌).

Phạm Thị Liên, the empress of Nguyễn Huệ, died in 1791. Bùi Thị Nhạn became the second wife of Huệ and crowned as the empress. Nguyễn Huệ died in the next year, Nguyễn Quang Toản ascended the throne, and granted her the title Empress dowager. 

In 1801, when the capital Phú Xuân (mordern Huế) fell to Nguyễn Ánh, she followed Nguyễn Quang Toản to Thăng Long (mordern Hanoi). Nguyễn Ánh's army captured Thăng Long. She fled to Xương Giang (in mordern Bắc Giang). In order to avoid being captured, she commit suicide together with Trần Thị Lan.

References

1802 deaths
People from Bình Định province
Tây Sơn dynasty empresses
Vietnamese empresses dowager
Tây Sơn dynasty generals
Women in war in Vietnam
Women in 19th-century warfare
Suicides in Vietnam